Jess McIver is an American astronomer and Associate Professor of Physics in the Department of Physics and Astronomy at the University of British Columbia.

Research 
McIver works with the instruments which enable detection of gravitational waves, including LIGO, Virgo, and KAGRA, among others. In particular, McIver and her group lead efforts in detector noise characterization and detector calibration. This work enables studies of merging systems of black holes and neutron stars. McIver also works on multi-messenger astronomy, and was part of the team which worked to detect the first binary neutron star merger, GW170817.

Awards 
McIver was (and is) a member of LIGO, one of the recipients of the Science 2017 Breakthrough of the Year  for Cosmic convergence: The merger of two neutron stars captivated thousands of observers and fulfilled multiple astrophysical predictions.

References 

Women astronomers
Living people
Year of birth missing (living people)
21st-century Canadian astronomers
21st-century American astronomers
21st-century American women scientists
21st-century Canadian women scientists
Academic staff of the University of British Columbia
American women academics
American women physicists
Canadian women physicists